Yaquelín Yaritza Durán Cuchilla (born 24 June 1994) is a Salvadoran footballer who plays as a midfielder for CD FAS and El Salvador women's national team.

Club career
Durán has played for FAS in El Salvador.

International career
Durán capped for El Salvador at senior level during the 2018 CONCACAF Women's Championship qualification.

See also
List of El Salvador women's international footballers

References

1994 births
Living people
Salvadoran women's footballers
Women's association football midfielders
El Salvador women's international footballers